Pollicipedomorpha is an order of pedunculated barnacles in the class Thecostraca. There are 3 families and more than 30 described species in Pollicipedomorpha.

Families
These families and genera belong to the order Pollicipedomorpha:
 Order Pollicipedomorpha Chan et al., 2021
 Family Lithotryidae Gruvel, 1905
 Genus Lithotrya Sowerby, 1822
 Family Pollicipedidae Leach, 1817
 Genus Anelasma Darwin, 1852
 Genus Capitulum Gray, 1825
 Genus Pollicipes Leach, 1817
 Family †Zeugmatolepadidae Newman, 1996
 Subfamily †Martillepadinae Gale, 2014
 Genus †Concinnalepas Gale, 2014
 Genus †Etcheslepas Gale, 2014
 Genus †Icenilepas Gale, 2014
 Genus †Litholepas Nagler, Haug, Glenner & Buckeridge, 2017
 Genus †Martillepas Gale, 2014
 Genus †Subsecolepas Gale, 2020
 Genus †Texaslepas Gale, 2020
 Subfamily †Zeugmatolepadinae Newman, 1996
 Genus †Aporolepas Withers, 1953
 Genus †Tetrinus Hirt, 1992
 Genus †Zeugmatolepas Withers, 1913

References

Further reading

 

Barnacles